Želatovice is a municipality and village in Přerov District in the Olomouc Region of the Czech Republic. It has about 500 inhabitants.

History
The first written mention of Želatovice is from 1282.

References

Villages in Přerov District